Lavalette may refer to:

Places
Lavalette (Aude), France
Lavalette, Hérault, France
Lavalette (Haute-Garonne), France
Lavallette, New Jersey, United States
Lavalette, West Virginia, United States

People with the surname
Antoine Marie Chamans, comte de Lavalette (1769–1830), French politician under Napoléon
Bernard Lavalette (1926–2019), French actor
Jean-Baptiste de Lavalette (1753–1794), French politician and general
Laure Lavalette (born 1976), French lawyer and politician

See also
La Valette
Valette (disambiguation)
Valletta

French-language surnames